Veveaham Schools are group of residential, English medium schools based on Dharapuram, Tiruppur district, India. It offers classes from Kindergarten to grade 12 and on providing a range of curriculums in Central Board of Secondary Education, Council for the Indian School Certificate Examinations and State board along with coaching for exams like NEET-UG, JEE main, CUET and Civil Services Examination.

References

External links

Boarding schools in Tamil Nadu
High schools and secondary schools in Tamil Nadu
Tiruppur district